Under the United States Bank Holding Company Act, financial and bank holding companies are regulated by the US Federal Reserve. Companies whose elections to be treated as financial holding companies are effective include:

0 - 9
1ST UNITED BANCORP, INC., Boca Raton, Florida

A
Ackermans & van Haaren, Antwerp, Belgium
Ally Financial, Detroit, Michigan
Alerus Financial, Grand Forks, North Dakota
Alphabet, Mountain View, California
American Express, New York, New York
Apple Bank for Savings, New York, New York
Australia and New Zealand Banking Group, Melbourne, Australia

B
BancFirst Corporation, Oklahoma City, Oklahoma
Banco Bradesco, Osasco, Brazil
Banco do Brasil, Brasilia, Brazil
BancorpSouth, Tupelo, Mississippi
Bank Hapoalim, Tel Aviv, Israel
Bank of America Corporation, Charlotte, North Carolina
Bank of Montreal, Montreal, Canada
The Bank of New York Mellon Corporation, New York, New York
Bank of Nova Scotia, Toronto, Canada
Barclays, London, England
Berkshire Hathaway, America
BNP Paribas, Paris, France
BOK Financial Corporation, Tulsa, Oklahoma
Busey Bank, Urbana, Illinois
Booking Holdings, Norwalk, Connecticut

C
CAJA DE AHORROS Y MONTE DE PIEDAD DE MADRID, Madrid, Spain
Canadian Imperial Bank of Commerce, Toronto, Canada
Capital One Financial Corporation, McLean, Virginia
Cardinal Financial Corporation, McLean, Virginia
Citigroup Inc., New York, New York
Citizens Bancorp, Corvallis, Oregon
City National Corporation, Beverly Hills, California
Comerica Incorporated, Dallas, Texas
Commerzbank AG, Frankfurt, Germany
Crédit Agricole S.A., Paris, France
Credit Suisse Group, Zurich, Switzerland
CULLEN/FROST BANKERS, INC., San Antonio, Texas

D
Deutsche Bank AG, Frankfurt, Germany
Discover Financial Services, Riverwoods, Illinois
DNB NOR ASA, Oslo, Norway
Doral Financial Corporation, San Juan, Puerto Rico
DREXEL MORGAN & CO., Radnor, Pennsylvania
DZ Bank AG, Frankfurt, Germany

E
EAST WEST BANCORP, INC., Pasadena, California

F
FIFTH THIRD BANCORP, Cincinnati, Ohio
FIRST BANCORP, San Juan, Puerto Rico
FIRST CITIZENS BANCORPORATION, INC., Columbia, South Carolina
First Citizens BancShares, Inc., Dyersburg, Tennessee
First Citizens BancShares, Inc., Raleigh, North Carolina
First City Monument Bank Ltd, Lagos, Nigeria 
First Commonwealth Financial Corporation, Indiana, Pennsylvania
FIRST HORIZON NATIONAL CORPORATION, Memphis, Tennessee
FIRST INTERSTATE BANCSYSTEM, INC., Billings, Montana
First Merchants Corporation, Muncie, Indiana
FMDQ Holdings PLC, Lagos, Nigeria
FNB Corporation, Hermitage, Pennsylvania

FMDQ Holdings PLC, Lagos, Nigeria
FNB Corporation, Hermitage, Pennsylvania

G
Goldman Sachs, New York, New York
The Governor and Company of the Bank of Ireland, Dublin, Ireland
Green Dot Corporation, Monrovia, California

H
Heirs Holdings,  Lagos, Nigeria
HORIZON BANCORP, Michigan City, Indiana
HSBC Holdings PLC, London, United Kingdom
HSH NORDBANK AG, Hamburg, Germany
Huntington Bancshares, Columbus, Ohio

I
IBERIABANK CORPORATION, Lafayette, Louisiana
International Bancshares Corporation, Laredo, Texas

J
JPMorgan Chase, New York, New York

K
KBC BANK NV, Brussels, Belgium
KEYCORP, Cleveland, Ohio
KLEIN FINANCIAL, INC., Chaska, Minnesota

L
LANDESBANK BADEN-WÜRTTEMBERG, Stuttgart, Germany
Lauritzen Corporation, Omaha, Nebraska
Lloyds Banking Group, London, England

M
M&T BANK CORPORATION, Buffalo, New York
MAINSOURCE FINANCIAL GROUP, Greensburg, Indiana
MIDWESTONE FINANCIAL GROUP, INC., Iowa City, Iowa
MITSUBISHI UFJ FINANCIAL GROUP, INC., Tokyo, Japan
MIZUHO FINANCIAL GROUP INC., Tokyo, Japan
MORGAN STANLEY, New York, New York

N
NATIONAL AUSTRALIA BANK LIMITED, Melbourne, Australia
National Bank of Canada, Montreal, Canada
NATIXIS, Paris, France
NatWest Group, Edinburgh, Scotland
NBT BANCORP INC., Norwich, New York
NEW YORK PRIVATE BANK & TRUST CORPORATION, New York, New York
Norinchukin Bank, Tokyo, Japan. 
Northern Trust Corporation, Chicago, Illinois

O
OLD NATIONAL BANCORP, Evansville, Indiana
ORIENTAL FINANCIAL GROUP INC., San Juan, Puerto Rico

P
PARK NATIONAL CORPORATION, Newark, Ohio
Patriot National Bancorp, Stamford, Connecticut
PEOPLES BANCORP, Rock Valley, Iowa
PNC Financial Services Group, Inc., Pittsburgh, Pennsylvania

R
Rabobank, Utrecht, the Netherlands
Regions Financial Corporation, Birmingham, Alabama
Royal Bank of Canada, Montreal, Canada

S
Skandinaviska Enskilda Banken, Stockholm, Sweden
Société Générale, Paris, France
SoftBank Group, Tokyo, Japan
State Street Corporation, Boston, Massachusetts
STERLING BANCORP, New York, New York

T
TCF Financial Corporation, Detroit, Michigan
Truist Financial, Charlotte, North Carolina

U
U.S. Bancorp, Minneapolis, Minnesota
UBS, Zurich, Switzerland
UMB Financial Corporation, Kansas City, Missouri
United Airlines Holdings, Chicago, Illinois,

W
Webster Financial Corporation, Waterbury, Connecticut
Wells Fargo, San Francisco, California
WesBanco, Wheeling, West Virginia
Wintrust Financial Corporation, Lake Forest, Illinois

Z
Zions Bancorporation, Salt Lake City, Utah

References

Lists of companies
Holding companies